Sabine Baeß, married name Marbach, (born 15 March 1961) is a German former pair skater. With her partner Tassilo Thierbach, she is the 1982 World champion and a two-time European champion (1982, 1983).

Career 
Baeß/Thierbach were coached by Irene Salzmann in Karl-Marx-Stadt (today Chemnitz) and represented the club SC Karl-Marx-Stadt. They were the only figure skating pair representing East Germany to win the World or European championships.

They won their first World Championship medal, a bronze, in 1979.  A mistake in the short program took them out of any chance of a medal at the 1980 Winter Olympics in Lake Placid however.

Baeß/Thierbach had to skip the 1981 Nationals and Europeans due to Thierbach's meniscus surgery in 1980.   They were however able to return to the Worlds in Hartford where they won a silver medal.

They won both Europeans and Worlds in 1982 on the basis of huge throws and consistency.   They defended their European titles in 1983 but despite two clean programs were beaten by Russian newcomers Elena Valova and Oleg Vassiliev, who they had just defeated at the Europeans and led after the short program here.  This was a controversial result to many people as Elena put her hands down on a throw.

They finished 2nd again to Valova & Vasiliev at the 1984 Europeans but went into the Sarajevo Olympics as one of the favorites for the gold medal.  A major mistake on an attempted double loop in the short program put them in 4th place though, and some more mistakes in the long program kept them just off the podium in 4th.  At their final Worlds in Ottawa they again had a significant problem in the short program, but were able to skate a stronger long program than the Olympics to climb from 4th to a bronze medal.

After 1990 (the year of the German reunification), Baeß performed in ice shows with Tobias Schröter, a former East German champion in pair skating. They appeared in Friedrichstadtpalast in Berlin.

Baeß later began working as a figure skating coach in Berlin at the club TSC Berlin.

Skating style 

Sabine and Tassilo were best known for their huge, consistent, and difficult throws.   They were one of the first pairs to regularly do the throw triple loop, and also regularly performed a throw triple toe loop.  They were an all around strong technical team with strong lifts, death spirals, side by side jumps, and a triple twist.   They were less strong on the artistic side of the sport.

Personal life 
Baeß married Olaf Marbach and has a son named Moritz. She lives in Berlin and works in health care.

Results
Pairs with Thierbach

References

East German news papers
 Junge Welt various issues 1980 to 1990
 Sportecho various issues from 1980 to 1990
 Bundesarchiv

External links

Navigation 

1961 births
Living people
Sportspeople from Dresden
People from Bezirk Dresden
German female pair skaters
Figure skaters at the 1980 Winter Olympics
Figure skaters at the 1984 Winter Olympics
Olympic figure skaters of East Germany
World Figure Skating Championships medalists
European Figure Skating Championships medalists
20th-century German women